The Angel is a 2007 short sci-fi martial arts horror film directed by Paul Hough starring Eddie McGee, Celine Tien and Thomy Kessler. It was inspired by Eddie McGee, a disabled actor who was trained in wire-work. The short film received multiple film festival awards.

Awards

Best Film at London Sci-Fi Film Festival Sci-fi-london,
Best Film at Newport Beach Film Festival
Best Film at Show Off Your Shorts Film Festival
Audience Award at Fantasia Film Festival,
Best Film at Long Island Film Festival
Best Film at California Film Festival,
10 Degrees Hotter Award at The Valley Film Festival

Other screenings

The USA Film Festival, Kansas City Jubilee, Waterfront Film Festival, NYC Downtown Shorts, StoneyBrook, Del Rey Beach, Fangoria's *Weekend Of Horrors,
The Florida Film Festival,
The Atlanta Film Festival,
The Silver Lake Film Festival,
The Denver International Film Festival,
The Gen Art Film Festival,
The Nashville Film Festival,
Palm Springs International Film Festival

THE ANGEL screened on CANAL+ in France on August 10, 2008.

Reviews
Filmthreat.com

References

External links
 

2007 films
2000s science fiction horror films
2007 horror films
2007 short films